The Federal Day of Thanksgiving, Repentance and Prayer is a public holiday in Switzerland. It is an interfaith feast observed by Roman Catholic dioceses, the Old Catholic Church, the Jewish and Muslim congregations and the Reformed church bodies as well as other Christian denominations.

It is celebrated on the third Sunday in September. In the Canton of Geneva another comparable fast, the Jeûne genevois, is celebrated.

The subsequent Monday (Lundi du Jeûne) is a public holiday in the canton of Vaud and unofficial holiday in the canton of Neuchâtel.

External links

http://www.bettag-jeunefederal.ch

Holidays and observances by scheduling (nth weekday of the month)
Swiss culture
Christian Sunday observances
September observances